Carlos Balestrini (8 March 1880 – 22 April 1972) was an Argentine sports shooter. He competed at the 1924 Summer Olympics and the 1936 Summer Olympics.

References

External links
 

1880 births
1972 deaths
Argentine male sport shooters
Olympic shooters of Argentina
Shooters at the 1924 Summer Olympics
Shooters at the 1936 Summer Olympics
Sportspeople from Córdoba, Argentina